Elisabeth "Eli" Ibarra Rabancho (born 29 June 1981) is a Spanish retired footballer who played as a midfielder or defender. She played club football for Eibartarrak FT from 1995 to 2002 and for Superliga/Primera División club Athletic Bilbao from 2002 to 2017. She made 44 appearances for the Spain national team, scoring two goals. 

Ibarra held the record for most appearances for the women's first-team of Athletic Bilbao (413) until overtaken by former teammate Erika Vázquez in 2022. Her 111 goals across all competitions made her their third-highest goalscorer of all time. She is also the only player to have taken part in all five league championships that the club has won.

Club career
Ibarra started playing football at the age of 13. She played for Eibartarrak FT (now SD Eibar) for seven seasons, from 1995 to 2002, before joining the newly-founded women's team of Athletic Bilbao in the summer of 2002, ahead of the 2002–03 Superliga Femenina season. When she first arrived at the club, she chose the number 17 shirt, in homage to former Athletic footballer Joseba Etxeberria. She made her debut in a 7–1 win over Torrejón at the Lezama Facilities, in what was the first ever match played by Athletic's women's team.

Ibarra scored in Athletic's first two appearances in the UEFA Women's Cup. In December 2012, she played her 300th match for Athletic. In 2016, she won her fifth league title with Athletic and agreed to remain with the club for another year. 

In May 2017, at the age of 35, she announced her retirement from football. She made a total of 413 appearances for Athletic Bilbao – 367 in the league, 32 in the Copa de la Reina, and 14 in the Champions League. She is the club's third highest goalscorer of all-time, behind Erika Vázquez and Nekane Díez, with 111 goals; of those, 104 came in the league, five in the Copa de la Reina, and two in the Champions League.

International career
Ibarra was a member of the Spanish national team, where she was deployed by Ignacio Quereda as a left wing-back. She was part of Spain's squads for UEFA Women's Euro 2013 in Sweden and the 2015 FIFA Women's World Cup in Canada.

Career statistics

International goals

Honours

Club
 Athletic Bilbao
 Primera División (5): 2002–03, 2003–04, 2004–05, 2006–07, 2015–16

References

External links
 
 
 Profile at Athletic Bilbao
 

1981 births
Living people
Spanish women's footballers
Spain women's international footballers
Footballers from the Basque Country (autonomous community)
Primera División (women) players
SD Eibar Femenino players
Athletic Club Femenino players
People from Azkoitia
Women's association football midfielders
2015 FIFA Women's World Cup players